Benazir Bhutto Hospital, also known as the Rawalpindi General Hospital, is a hospital located on the Murree Road, Rawalpindi, Pakistan. It is a major teaching hospital offering basic specialties as well as psychiatry, orthopaedics, urology and cardiology. It is associated with Rawalpindi Medical University.

It is the place where Benazir Bhutto died on 27 December 2007.

History
The hospital was opened as a district headquarters hospital in 1957.

Departments
 Medicine
 Surgery
 Gynecology and Obstetrics
 Otorhinolaryngology
 Ophthalmology
 Pathology
 Psychiatry (upgraded to Institute of Psychiatry)
 Orthopedic Surgery
 Urology
 Radiology
 Cardiology
 Dermatology

The Psychiatry Department has been upgraded to the Institute of Psychiatry, the first of its kind in Punjab. The Institute of Psychiatry is also the regional center of W.H.O. for mental health.

Notes

Memorials to Benazir Bhutto
Teaching hospitals in Pakistan
Hospitals established in 1957
1957 establishments in Pakistan
Hospitals in Rawalpindi